Cronquistianthus is a genus of shrubs native to the Andes in Colombia, Ecuador, and Peru.

The genus is named after the American botanist Arthur John Cronquist (1919–1992).

 Species

References

 
Flora of South America
Asteraceae genera
Taxonomy articles created by Polbot